Kiana Danial is the author of four books including Cryptocurrency Investing For Dummies and Invest Diva's Guide to Making Money in Forex. In 2020, Kiana co-authored her fourth book, Million Dollar Moms: Mom Entrepreneurs Share Secrets of Building Businesses & Raising Highly Successful Kids. 

Kiana is the CEO of Invest Diva, as well as a finance writer for Nasdaq. She has appeared as an expert on cryptocurrency and wealth management on outlets such as The Wall Street Journal, Time, CNN, Forbes, Fox News and The Street.

Personal life 
Kiana Danial was born and raised in Iran to a Jewish family. She received a M.S. in Electrical Engineering with a minor in Quantum Physics from Tokyo's University of Electro-Communications. Danial married her husband on Pi Day in 2015.

Bibliography

Awards 
Danial has been awarded 2018 Personal Investment Expert of the Year at the Investor Fund Awards and in 2016, she was named one of New York Business Journal's Women of Influence.

References

1984 births
Living people
American television reporters and correspondents
American business and financial journalists
American women television journalists
Journalists from New York City
Women business and financial journalists
21st-century American journalists
American business writers
Women business writers
21st-century American women writers
21st-century American non-fiction writers
American women non-fiction writers
American financial writers